The 1975 Gael Linn Cup, the most important representative competition for elite level participants in the women's team field sport of camogie, was played at junior level only in the three years 1975-7. It was won by Munster, who defeated Ulster in the final.

Arrangements
Munster raced into a five-goal lead against Leinster, before Leinster hauled back 1–1 in the semi-final of the revamped Gael-Linn Cup at Gowran, Co. Kilkenny. Ulster defeated Connacht 3–1 to 1–5 in the second semi-final at Carrickmacross. Munster used nine Limerick players in their 5–1 to 2–0 victory over Ulster, one of the exceptions, Frances Barry-Murphy was a sister of Jimmy Barry Murphy

Final stages

|}

References

External links
 Camogie Association

1975 in camogie
1975
Cam